Lukáš Schut (born 9 December 1985) is a Czech football player who currently plays for Einheit Rudolstadt. He joined FK Viktoria Žižkov on loan in 2011 but only played two games before returning to Baník Most.

References

External links
 Profile at iDNES.cz 

1985 births
Living people
Czech footballers
Czech First League players
FK Baník Most players
FK Viktoria Žižkov players
Association football midfielders